The Bihar Lokayukta is the Parliamentary Ombudsman for the state of Bihar (India). It is a high level statutory functionary,  created to address grievances of the public against ministers, legislators, administration and public servants in issues related to misuse of power, mal-administration and corruption. It was first formed under the Bihar Lokayukta and Upa-Lokayukta Act, and approved by the president of India on 2011. The passage of Lokpal and Lokayukta's Act, 2013 in Parliament had become law on January 16, 2014 and requires each state to appoint its Lokayukta within a year.  A bench of Lokayukta should consist of judicial and non-judicial members. An Upa-Lokayukta is a deputy to Lokayukta and assists him in his work and acts in-charge Lokayukta in case the position fells vacant before time.

A Lokayukta of the state is appointed to office by the state Governor after consulting the committee consisting of State Chief Minister, Speaker of Legislative Assembly, Leader of Opposition, Chairman of Legislative Council and Leader of Opposition of Legislative Council and cannot be removed from office except for reasons specified in the Act and will serve the period of five years.

History and administration 
Bihar Lokayukta and Upa Lokayuka Act was passed on 22 December 2011. To prevent misuse of the institution the Act was amended in the year 2021. The office of Bihar Lokayukta is situated in 4, Kautilya Marg, Bailey Road, Patna-800001, Bihar.

Oath or affirmation

Powers 
As per the Bihar Lokayukta's Act, it empowers the Lokayukta to file a case in a special court of complaint received by it and forward the report with its findings and recommendation for disciplinary action to the competent authority against the complainant. Bihar Lokayukta has independent powers to investigate and prosecute any government official or public servants of all grades, who are covered by the act and against whom the complaint is received for abusing his authority for self interest or causes hurt to anyone or any action done intentionally or following corrupt practices negatively impacting the state or individual. Once a complaint is received on allegations of corruption, wrong use of authority and misdeeds by any of the public functionaries who may include the Chief Minister, Ministers under him and members of Legislature Assembly, Lokayukta has the power to recommend enquiry to necessary authorities and prosecute, if proven.

In year 2021, to avoid the wastage of the institution time and its misuse and penalising the people for filing wrong cases, an amendment had been introduced in the Bihar Lokayukta and Upa-Lokayukta's Act.

Appointment and tenure 
Following are the details and tenure of Bihar Lokayuktas.

Notable cases 
In August 2021, in a case relating to alleged serious irregularities by some BR Ambedkar University officials in appointments and financial lapses in the University, the Bihar High Court has asked the petitioner to approach the Bihar Lokayukta.

The Lokayukta of Bihar in one of its observations highlighted the financial mis-management issues in Purnea University.

See also 

The Lokpal and Lokayuktas Act, 2013

West Bengal Lokayukta

Delhi Lokayukta

Karnataka Lokayukta

Maharashtra Lokayukta

Uttar Pradesh Lokayukta

References

External links 
 Official website

Lokayuktas
Government of Bihar
2011 establishments in Bihar
Government agencies established in 2011